Sir Robert Cordell, 1st Baronet (died c. 1680), of Long Melford, Suffolk, was an English landowner and politician who sat in the House of Commons at various times between 1660 and 1679.

Cordell was the son of Sir John Cordell, of St Lawrence Old Jewry, London and his wife Sarah, daughter of Robert Bankworth or Barbow of London. Cordell married in or before 1643 Margaret Wright, daughter of Sir Edmund Wright, of Swakeleys House, Ickenham, Middlesex Lord Mayor of London and his first wife, Martha Baron, daughter of Edward Baron, of London.  Before 1643, he repurchased from the family of Savage the estate of Long Melford formerly belonging to Sir William Cordell  and it became his residence. He was Sheriff of Suffolk from 1653 to 1654. 

In April 1660, Cordell was elected Member of Parliament for Sudbury but the election was declared void in May. He was created a baronet on 22 June 1660. He was elected MP for Sudbury in a by-election to the Cavalier Parliament in 1662. In 1679 he was re-elected MP for Sudbury in the First Exclusion Parliament.
   
Cordell  was buried on 3 January 1680, at St. Lawrence Jewry London. His wife  was buried on 24 March 1681 with her father and husband at St Lawrence Jewry. Their son John succeeded to the baronetcy.  Their daughter, Sarah, married the politician Sir William Spring.

References

Year of birth missing
1680 deaths
English landowners
Baronets in the Baronetage of England
High Sheriffs of Suffolk
English MPs 1661–1679
English MPs 1679
People from Long Melford